Gigaspermaceae are a family of mosses in the monotypic order Gigaspermales.  The order is placed in subclass Gigaspermidae of the class Bryopsida. They were previously placed in subclass Funariidae.

References

 
 

Moss families
Gigaspermales